Haaren may refer to:

Places
Haaren (Aachen), a district of Aachen, Germany
Haaren, North Brabant, a town in North Brabant, Netherlands
Haaren (river), of Lower Saxony, Germany

People
Dirk van Haaren (1878–1953), Dutch painter
Heinz van Haaren (born 1940), Dutch footballer
John Henry Haaren  (1855–1916), American educator and historian
Marijke van Haaren (born 1952), Dutch politician
Ramon van Haaren (born 1972), Dutch footballer
Ricky van Haaren (born 1991), Dutch footballer

See also
 Haren (disambiguation)